Irvin "Zabo" Koszewski (August 20, 1924 – March 29, 2009) was an American professional bodybuilder and a 2007 inductee to the International Federation of BodyBuilders Hall of Fame.

Biography
Koszewski was particularly known for his abdominal muscles. John Balik of Iron Man magazine recalled that "he had a 10-pack of abs when everyone else had a six-pack."

Koszewski appeared in the Cheech and Chong film Nice Dreams (1981) and was the stunt double for Tommy Chong in Things Are Tough All Over (1982). He also appeared in the 2005 documentary film a/k/a Tommy Chong.  A photograph of Koszewski is included in the iconic Pop Art collage Just what is it that makes today's homes so different, so appealing?

Koszewski died of pneumonia in Doylestown, Pennsylvania at the age of 84.

Titles
1953 Mr. Los Angeles
1953 Mr. California
1954 Mr. California

Filmography (actor)

See also
List of male professional bodybuilders
List of female professional bodybuilders

References

External links

American bodybuilders
1924 births
Professional bodybuilders
2009 deaths
Deaths from pneumonia in Pennsylvania